The Porticus Vipsania was a map of the world once displayed in the Campus Agrippae, located in Rome, not far from the Via Flaminia. It was designed by Marcus Vipsanius Agrippa and constructed by his sister Vipsania Polla after Agrippa died. The map was named either directly after Vipsania Polla or the gens Vipsania, which Polla and her brother Agrippa belonged to.

History
Augustus had a world map engraved on marble, following the descriptions given in Agrippa's geographical work, the Commentarii. Agrippa began construction of the map before his death in 12 BC, after which his sister Vipsania Polla oversaw the project. It was not yet completed by 7 BC when Augustus opened the Campus Agrippae to the public. Polla had likely died before this as Augustus was the one who finished the project at a later date. It was the relatives of a person who were responsible for completing tasks begun by a person, once his sister died Augustus who was Agrippas father-in-law likely felt responsible for it. It was considered inappropriate to interfere with another family's works so Augustus included a description by the portico which explained the process of its making. Although the Porticus Vipsania has not survived, a description of it is given in Natural History by Pliny the Elder, and it is also known through the Peutinger Map.

Location

See also
 Forma Urbis Romae

References

External links

 Porticus Vipsania

Maps of ancient Rome
Marble sculptures in Italy
Marcus Vipsanius Agrippa
Augustan building projects